Ennappadam Venkatarama Bhagavatar (1880–1961) was a composer of Carnatic music.

One of his books, Venkata Ramaniyam, has been recommended as a textbook by Kerala University.

References

1880 births
1961 deaths
Carnatic composers
20th-century Indian musicians